Benjamin Bucknall (1833 – 16 November 1895) was an English architect of the Gothic Revival in South West England and South Wales, and then of neo-Moorish architecture in Algeria. His most noted works include the uncompleted Woodchester Mansion in Gloucestershire, England and his restoration of the Villa Montfeld in El Biar, Algiers.

Career
In 1851 Bucknall began work as a millwright, but in 1852 William Leigh helped him to start work for the architect Charles Hansom in Clifton, Bristol. Hansom was a Roman Catholic and in 1852 Bucknall converted to Catholicism.

Bucknall admired the work of the French architect Eugène Viollet-le-Duc, and travelled to visit him in France in 1861 and in Lausanne, Switzerland in 1872. Between 1874 and 1881 Bucknall translated five of Viollet-le-Duc's works into English.

Family
Bucknall was the fifth of seven sons born to Edwin and Mary Bucknall of Rodborough, Gloucs. In 1862 Bucknall was married to Henrietta King. After 1864 they moved to Swansea and by 1869 were living in Oystermouth. The Bucknalls had four children: Mary, Charles (born 1864), Edgar (born 1868) and Beatrice (born 1870).

Bucknall's health deteriorated and he spent the winter of 1876–77 in Algiers. In 1878 he settled there permanently, leaving Henrietta and the children in Gloucestershire. The 1881 Census recorded Henrietta and Mary living at Bisley, Gloucestershire. Some of their children visited Bucknall in Algiers, and Edgar died there in a boating accident in 1889.

In Algiers Bucknall changed his architectural style to neo-Moorish architecture, in which he built villas, notably in the El Biar district of Algiers. His works include a restoration of the Villa Montfeld, now the residence of the US Ambassador to Algeria. He died in Algiers in 1895 and is buried there. A road in Algiers was named Chemin Bucknall in his honour, but since independence it has been renamed.

Buildings

Houses
Woodchester Mansion, Gloucs, circa 1858
St Stephens, a cottage orné at Nympsfield, Gloucs, circa 1860
Tocknells House, Painswick, Gloucs, circa 1860
West Grange, Stroud, Gloucs, 1866
Villa Montfeld, El Biar, Algiers: restoration

Churches and monastic houses
Church of Our Lady and St Michael, Abergavenny, Monmouthshire, 1858
Saint George RC church, Taunton, Somerset, 1860
St Mary's Roman Catholic Church, Monmouth, 1861–71
St Wulstan's Roman Catholic Church, Little Malvern, Worcestershire, 1862
Saint David's Priory RC church, Swansea, Glamorgan: extension, 1864
Saint Thomas' RC church, Fairford, Gloucestershire: presbytery, 1865
Holy Trinity Church of England parish church, Llanegwad, Carmarthenshire, 1865–78
Holy Trinity Church of England parish church, Slad, Gloucs: reconstruction, 1869
Longworth Chapel, Bartestree Convent, Herefordshire (with E.W. Pugin), 1869–70
Saint Francis of Assisi RC Church, Baddesley Clinton convent, Warwickshire (with T.R. Donnelly), 1870
Saint Rose of Lima Convent, Stroud, Gloucs.
Abbotskerswell Priory, Newton Abbot, Devon: later buildings
Swansea Seamen's Church

Other buildings
Swansea Grammar School
Imperial Hotel, Stroud

Translations from French into English

References

Sources

External links
 
 
 

1833 births
1895 deaths
19th-century English architects
Gothic Revival architects
English ecclesiastical architects
Architecture in Algeria
People from Rodborough
British expatriates in Algeria
Architects from Gloucestershire